
Lac de Joux is a lake in the Vallée de Joux in the Canton of Vaud, Switzerland. With a surface area of 9.5 km², it is the largest lake in Switzerland lying above 1,000 metres. Lac de Joux is located in the Jura Mountains.

See also
List of lakes of Switzerland
List of mountain lakes of Switzerland

References

External links

Waterlevels of  Lac de Joux at Le Pont

Lakes of Switzerland
Lakes of the canton of Vaud
L Lac de Joux